The tōyō kanji, also known as the tōyō kanjihyō ("list of kanji for general use") are the result of a reform of the Kanji characters of Chinese origin in the Japanese written language. They were the kanji declared "official", i.e. characters that could be used in official government documents, by the Japanese  on November 16, 1946.

The 1,850-character list was not meant to be exhaustive, as many characters that were in common use at the time, and are today, were not included. It was meant as a baseline for satisfactory functional literacy in Japanese at a secondary education level, as all of the listed characters were to be taught nationwide in compulsory education.

They were replaced in 1981 by the jōyō kanji, which initially included 1,945 characters, but was expanded to 2,136 characters in 2010 following several revisions.

Reform

Thousands of kanji characters were in use in various writing systems, leading to great difficulties for those learning written Japanese. Additionally, several characters had identical meanings but were written differently from each other, further increasing complexity.

After World War II, the Ministry of Education decided to minimize the number of kanji by choosing the most commonly used kanji, along with simplified kanji (see Shinjitai) commonly appearing in contemporary literature, to form the tōyō kanji. This was an integral part of the postwar reform of Japanese national writing.

This was meant as a preparation for re-introducing their previous unsuccessful reform abolishing Chinese characters. Although the postwar timing meant no public debate was held on the future of the Japanese written language, the defenders of the original kanji system considered and accepted the tōyō kanji as a reasonable compromise. Since this compromise could not then be withdrawn in favour of more radical reform, discussion of kanji abolition ended. Thirty-five years passed before further reforms were brought to the Japanese written form.

The table of the pronunciations of the kanji was published in 1948 and the exposition of altered character forms (Shinjitai) in 1949.

In 1981, the Ministry of Education decided to replace the tōyō kanji with a more flexible system, leading to the publication of the jōyō kanji. This rendered the tōyō kanji obsolete.

Applications and limitations

In addition to a list of the standardized tōyō kanji, the reform published by the Ministry for Education in 1946 also contains a set of guidelines for their use.

Regarding provenance and scope, the foreword of the document states that:
The table of tōyō kanji put forth therein, are the selection of kanji recommended for use by the general public, including legal and governmental documents, newspapers, and magazines.
The presented kanji are selected as an approximate set of those characters found to be of no insignificant utility in the lives of today's Japanese citizens.
Concerning proper nouns, there is a wide range of usage beyond what may be formulated as rules, and consequently they are treated as outside the scope of this standard.
The simplified character forms from modern custom are taken as the proper form, and their original forms are provided alongside them for reference.
A systemization of the character forms and their readings is still under consideration (this referring to the later 1948 and 1949 publications that addressed these points in detail).

Regarding guidelines for use, it continues:
If the kanji set forth in this standard do not suffice for the writing of a word, then either a different word should be substituted, or else the word shall be written in kana.
Write pronouns, adverbs, conjunctions, interjections, auxiliary verbs, and particles using kana as much as possible (normally hiragana is used for these).
Words of foreign origin are to be written in kana (katakana is customarily used, but exceptions occur).
Names of plants and animals should be written in kana (katakana is frequently but not ubiquitously used for these).
(This rule is not widely followed in practice.)
As a general rule, furigana should not be used.
Concerning technical and specialized terminology, it is hoped that the list of characters prescribed by the list of tōyō kanji will serve as a template for further standardization (acknowledging that the tōyō list may be insufficient for these applications, but should be used to guide more complete de facto standards).

(In the above, parenthetical remarks are used for exposition and do not reflect text that is present in the document.)

Mazegaki

Because the majority of character-based words are composed of two (or more) kanji, many words were left with one character included in the Tōyō kanji, and the other character missing. These words were called .

List of the 1,850 tōyō kanji

See also
 Japanese script reform

References

External links
Pronunciation of the Kanji 
Statement of the Ministry of Education from 1946 
Official table of the characters 

Kanji